is a 2012 Japanese film directed by Takashi Kubota.

Cast
Shintaro Morimoto
Hokuto Matsumura
Yuya Takaki
Taiga Kyomoto 
Haruka Shimazaki (AKB48)
Mina Ōba (AKB48, SKE48)
Kaoru Mitsumune
Hiroki Uchi
Toshiya Miyata 
Rena Katō (AKB48)
Miyu Takeuchi (AKB48)
Rina Kawaei (AKB48)
Juri Takahashi (AKB48)
Miori Ichikawa (AKB48, NMB48)
Hikaru Iwanoto (Johnny's Jr.)
Daisuke Sakuma (Johnny's Jr.)
Ryōhei Abe (Johnny's Jr.)
Shōta Watanabe (Johnny's Jr.)
Tatsuya Fukasawa (Johnny's Jr.)
Ryōta Miyadate (Johnny's Jr.)

References

External links
Official website 

2012 films
2010s Japanese films
2010s Japanese-language films